Tetraena fontanesii, synonym Zygophyllum fontanesii, is a species of plant of the family Zygophyllaceae. It is found in Macaronesia and northwest Africa.

Description
This halophile and xerophile plant can grow up to 50 cm. It has sub-cylindrical or curved leaves and flowers ranging from white to yellow. Its fruit measures 5–7 mm.

Distribution
The plant occurs in the Canary Islands, Cape Verde and northwest Africa (Morocco, Western Sahara, Mauritania and Senegal).

References

Zygophylloideae
Succulent plants
Flora of the Canary Islands
Flora of Cape Verde
Flora of Mauritania
Flora of Morocco
Flora of Senegal
Flora of Western Sahara
Flora of Fuerteventura
Flora of Lanzarote
Flora of Tenerife
Flora of the Savage Islands